Poinciana may refer to:

 Delonix regia or royal poinciana, a tree
 Caesalpinia pulcherrima, a shrub
 Poinciana, a synonym of the legume genus Caesalpinia
 Poinciana, Florida, a place
 "Poinciana" (song), a 1936 standard song composed by Nat Simon and Buddy Bernier
 Poinciana (Ahmad Jamal album), featuring the above song
 Poinciana (Nick Brignola album), featuring the above song